Audun Kleive (born 20 October 1961) is a Norwegian jazz drummer. He was raised in Skien and is the son of organist Kristoffer Kleive and brother of organist Iver Kleive.

Career

Kleive began to play drums in a rock and dance band, and then went to Oslo, where he studied at the Norwegian Academy of Music. He joined the jazz-rock groups Lotus (1981–83) and Oslo 13 (1981–84), and made his recording debut with the album Anti-therapy in 1983. Described as one of the "leading lights in the Oslo Nu-jazz scene", he made his distinctive contribution to groups like Terje Rypdal's Chasers, Per Jørgensen's JøKleBa and Jon Balke's Magnetic North Orchestra as well as Marilyn Mazur & Future Song.

Kleive has released the albums, Bitt (1996–97), Generator X (2000) and Ohmagoddabl (2004) on Bugge Wesseltoft's label, Jazzland.
In 2010 he gave a concert as a duet with the jazz tenorist Petter Wettre. The concert was recorded and released on the album The Only Way to Travel 2 (2011), as a follow up of the 2000 volume 1 album. In 2013 he was engaged for a set on the Music  Festival 'Punktfestivalen' in Kristiansand, where he also collaborated on recordings for the album Crime scenes (2006) with Jan Bang and Erik Honoré among others.

Awards and honors
1999: Kongsberg Jazz Award

Discography

As leader
 Music for Men and Machines (Curling Legs, 1993)
 Audun Kleive Generator X (Jazzland/EmArcy, 2000)
 Ohmagoddabl (Jazzland, 2004)
 Attack (POLselection, 2012)
 Release (POLselection, 2012)

With 1300 Oslo
 Anti-Therapy (Odin, 1983)
 Off Balance (Odin, 1988)
 Live (Curling Legs, 1993)
 Live in the North (Curling Legs, 2001)

With Entra
 Live Lights (Timeless, 1989)
 Ballet (LJ, 1992)
 In Concert (LJ, 1998)

With Jokleba
 Jokleba! (Norsk 1993)
 Live! (Curling Legs, 1996)
 Jokleba! & Nu Jok? (EmArcy/Universal 2011)
 Outland (ECM, 2014)

With Scheen Jazzorkester
 God Tro, Feil Frakk (Grong Music, 2013)
 Magne Rutle Blane (Grong Music, 2015)
 PoliturPassiarer (Losen, 2017)
 Tamanoar (Losen, 2017)
 Commuter Report (Losen, 2018)

As sideman
With Jon Balke
 On and On (Odin, 1991)
 Nonsentration (ECM, 1992)
 Further (ECM, 1994)
 Kyanos (ECM, 2002)

With Kari Bremnes
 Tid a Hausta Inn (Pa Norsk, 1983)
 Mitt Ville Hjerte (Kirkelig Kulturverksted, 1987)
 Bla Krukke (Kirkelig Kulturverksted, 1989)
 Losrivelse (Kirkelig Kulturverksted, 1993)

With Arve Henriksen
 Chiaroscuro (Rune Grammofon, 2004)
 Cartography (ECM, 2008)
 The Nature of Connections (Rune Grammofon, 2014)
 Composograph (Arve Music 2018)

With Jan Gunnar Hoff
 Syklus (Odin, 1993)
 Moving (Curling Legs, 1995)
 Crosslands (Curling Legs, 1998)
 In Town (Curling Legs, 2003)
 Magma (Grappa, 2008)
 Jan Gunnar Hoff Group Featuring Mike Stern (Losen, 2018)
 Polarity (2L, 2018)

With Marilyn Mazur
 Marilyn Mazur's Future Song (veraBra, 1992)
 Small Labyrinths (ECM, 1997)
 All the Birds Reflecting + Adventurous (Stunt, 2002)
 Daylight Stories (Stunt, 2004)

With Terje Rypdal
 Chaser (ECM, 1985)
 Blue (ECM, 1987)
 The Singles Collection (ECM, 1989)
 Rypdal & Tekro (RCA, 1994)
 If Mountains Could Sing (ECM, 1995)
 Rypdal & Tekro II (Grappa, 1997)
 The Radiosong (Beatheaven, 2002)

With others
 Eivind Aarset, Dream Logic (ECM, 2012)
 Ab und Zu, Spark of Life (Curling Legs, 2002)
 Arild Andersen, If You Look Far Enough (ECM, 1993)
 Stefano Bollani, Napoli Trip (Decca, 2016)
 Armen Donelian, Trio '87 (Odin, 1988)
 Pierre Dorge, The Jazzpar Prize (Enja, 1992)
 Jon Eberson, Stash (Odin, 1986)
 Jon Eberson, Pigs and Poetry (CBS, 1987)
 Mathias Eick, The Door (ECM, 2008)
 Jan Eggum, Dacapo (Sigma Music 1990)
 Jan Eggum, President (Grappa, 2002)
 Sidsel Endresen, Undertow (Jazzland/EmArcy, 2000)
 Extended Noise, Slow But Sudden Langsam, Aber Plotzlich (Odin, 1990)
 Anne-Marie Giortz, Breaking Out (Hot Club, 1983)
 Sigmund Groven & Arve Tellefsen, Musikken Inni Oss (Polydor, 1981)
 Thomas Gustafsson, T.G. Evil Orchestra (Dragon, 1999)
 Bendik Hofseth, Colours (Sonet/Verve 1997)
 Per Husby, Notes for Nature (Odin, 1990)
 Anders Jormin, Eight Pieces (Dragon, 1988)
 Rune Klakegg & Scheen Jazzorkester, Fjon (Losen, 2016)
 Olga Konkova & Carl Morten Iversen & Audun Kleive, Going with the Flow (Curling Legs, 1997)
 Fredrik Lundin, People, Places, Times and Faces (Storyville, 1993)
 Magnetic North Orchestra, Solarized (Emarcy, 1999)
 Rita Marcotulli, Koine (Storie Di Note 2002)
 Hans Mathisen, Moving Forward (Curling Legs, 2019)
 Nils Petter Molvaer, Hamada Sula, (EmArcy, 2009)
 Silje Nergaard, One of These Mornings & My Funny Valentine (Philips, 1984)
 Lina Nyberg, Brasilien (Prophone, 2001)
 Steinar Ofsdal, Vestenfor Mane (Slager, 1989)
 Punkt, Crime Scenes (Punkt 2006)
 Live Maria Roggen, Apokaluptein (Kirkelig Kulturverksted, 2016)
 David Sylvian, Sleepwalkers (Samadhisound, 2010)
 Hans Ulrik, Slow Procession (Stunt, 2009)
 Bugge Wesseltoft, New Conception of Jazz (Jazzland, 1997)

References

External links

Official Facebook Page
Kleive, Audun - Biography at Norsk Jazzarkiv, January 2009 (in Norwegian)

Sources
Deutsche Nationalbibliothek, Kleive, Audun (in German, accessed 12 April 2010)
Mathieson, Kenny, "Dented instrument is no bar to lively performance from saxophone maestro", The Scotsman, 1 July 2008 (accessed 12 April 2010)
Nicholson, Stuart, "The Oslo Underground and European Nu-Jazz",  JazzTimes, Vol. 31, No. 4, May 2001, p. 69 (accessed 12 April 2010)
Nicholson, Stuart, "Europeans Cut In With a New Jazz Sound And Beat", The New York Times, 3 June 2001 (accessed 12 April 2010)

1961 births
Living people
Musicians from Skien
20th-century Norwegian drummers
21st-century Norwegian drummers
Norwegian jazz drummers
Male drummers
Norwegian jazz composers
Avant-garde jazz musicians
Jazzland Recordings (1997) artists
ECM Records artists
20th-century drummers
Male jazz composers
20th-century Norwegian male musicians
21st-century Norwegian male musicians
1300 Oslo members
Ab und Zu members
Extended Noise members
JøKleBa members
Losen Records artists
Curling Legs artists
EmArcy Records artists